The arrondissement of Langon is an arrondissement of France in the Gironde department in the Nouvelle-Aquitaine region. It has 196 communes.

Composition

The communes of the arrondissement of Langon are:

Aillas
Arbanats
Aubiac
Auriolles
Auros
Bagas
Baigneaux
Balizac
Barie
Barsac
Bassanne
Bazas
Béguey
Bellebat
Bellefond
Bernos-Beaulac
Berthez
Bieujac
Birac
Blaignac
Blasimon
Bommes
Bourdelles
Bourideys
Brannens
Brouqueyran
Budos
Cadillac
Camiran
Capian
Captieux
Cardan
Casseuil
Castelmoron-d'Albret
Castelviel
Castets et Castillon
Caudrot
Caumont
Cauvignac
Cazalis
Cazats
Cazaugitat
Cérons
Cessac
Cleyrac
Coimères
Coirac
Courpiac
Cours-de-Monségur
Cours-les-Bains
Coutures
Cudos
Daubèze
Dieulivol
Donzac
Escaudes
Escoussans
Les Esseintes
Faleyras
Fargues
Floudès
Fontet
Fossès-et-Baleyssac
Frontenac
Gabarnac
Gajac
Gans
Gironde-sur-Dropt
Giscos
Gornac
Goualade
Grignols
Guillos
Hostens
Hure
Illats
Labescau
Ladaux
Lados
Lamothe-Landerron
Landerrouat
Landerrouet-sur-Ségur
Landiras
Langoiran
Langon
Laroque
Lartigue
Lavazan
Léogeats
Lerm-et-Musset
Lestiac-sur-Garonne
Lignan-de-Bazas
Listrac-de-Durèze
Loubens
Louchats
Loupiac
Loupiac-de-la-Réole
Lucmau
Lugasson
Marimbault
Marions
Martres
Masseilles
Massugas
Mauriac
Mazères
Mérignas
Mesterrieux
Mongauzy
Monprimblanc
Monségur
Montagoudin
Montignac
Morizès
Mourens
Neuffons
Le Nizan
Noaillac
Noaillan
Omet
Origne
Paillet
Pellegrue
Le Pian-sur-Garonne
Podensac
Pompéjac
Pondaurat
Porte-de-Benauge
Portets
Préchac
Preignac
Pujols-sur-Ciron
Le Puy
Puybarban
La Réole
Rimons
Rions
Roaillan
Romagne
Roquebrune
Ruch
Saint-André-du-Bois
Saint-Antoine-du-Queyret
Saint-Brice
Saint-Côme
Sainte-Croix-du-Mont
Sainte-Foy-la-Longue
Sainte-Gemme
Saint-Exupéry
Saint-Félix-de-Foncaude
Saint-Ferme
Saint-Genis-du-Bois
Saint-Germain-de-Grave
Saint-Hilaire-de-la-Noaille
Saint-Hilaire-du-Bois
Saint-Laurent-du-Bois
Saint-Laurent-du-Plan
Saint-Léger-de-Balson
Saint-Loubert
Saint-Macaire
Saint-Maixant
Saint-Martial
Saint-Martin-de-Lerm
Saint-Martin-de-Sescas
Saint-Martin-du-Puy
Saint-Michel-de-Castelnau
Saint-Michel-de-Lapujade
Saint-Michel-de-Rieufret
Saint-Pardon-de-Conques
Saint-Pierre-d'Aurillac
Saint-Pierre-de-Bat
Saint-Pierre-de-Mons
Saint-Sève
Saint-Sulpice-de-Guilleragues
Saint-Sulpice-de-Pommiers
Saint-Symphorien
Saint-Vivien-de-Monségur
Sauternes
Sauveterre-de-Guyenne
Sauviac
Savignac
Semens
Sendets
Sigalens
Sillas
Soulignac
Soussac
Taillecavat
Targon
Toulenne
Le Tuzan
Uzeste
Verdelais
Villandraut
Villenave-de-Rions
Virelade

History

The arrondissement of Bazas was created in 1800. The subprefecture was moved to Langon in 1926. At the May 2006 reorganisation of the arrondissements of Gironde, it gained the cantons of Cadillac and Podensac from the arrondissement of Bordeaux.

As a result of the reorganisation of the cantons of France which came into effect in 2015, the borders of the cantons are no longer related to the borders of the arrondissements. The cantons of the arrondissement of Langon were, as of January 2015:

 Auros
 Bazas
 Cadillac
 Captieux
 Grignols
 Langon
 Monségur
 Pellegrue
 Podensac
 La Réole
 Saint-Macaire
 Saint-Symphorien
 Sauveterre-de-Guyenne
 Targon
 Villandraut

References

Langon